Jeong Han (born May 17, 1988) is a South Korean handball player. He was born in Seoul. He competed for the South Korean national team at the 2012 Summer Olympics in London.

References

1988 births
Living people
South Korean male handball players
Olympic handball players of South Korea
Handball players at the 2012 Summer Olympics
21st-century South Korean people